TBNA may refer to:

 Tianjin Binhai New Area
 Transbronchial needle aspiration